Aarati Bidari is a Nepali legbreak bowler for Nepal women's national cricket team.

Aarati had debuted in the International match for Nepal in a T20I match against Thailand women's national cricket team on 19 January 2019. The match was the part of the 2019 ICC Women's Qualifier Asia in Bangkok, Thailand. It was a tournament which is an Asia region qualifier for the 2019 ICC Women's World Twenty20 Qualifier as well as the 2020 Women's Cricket World Cup Qualifier tournaments, with the top team progressing to both of them.

References

Living people
Nepalese women cricketers
1992 births
Nepal women Twenty20 International cricketers